Yanguas is a municipality located in the province of Soria, Castile and León, Spain. According to the 2004 census (INE), the municipality had a population of 128 inhabitants.

See also
 Yanguas de Eresma – a different community in a nearby province

References

External links

Municipalities in the Province of Soria